The  is an indoor botanical garden located at 8-29-2 Takashimadaira, Itabashi, Tokyo, Japan. 
It is open daily except Mondays. It was closed to start renovation work in September 2020 and reopened on April 20, 2021.

Overview
The garden is a greenhouse containing more than 300 species of Southeast Asian plants, with an aquarium of tropical fish, mangrove forest with Nypa fruticans, and other plants including Dipterocarpaceae, orchids, and rhododendrons. 
The aquarium is home to deep-sea fish, coral reef fish, Asian Tropical Rain Forest creatures, and long-term giant freshwater stingray.

See also 
Facilities with the same Management
Yokohama Hakkeijima Sea Paradise
Maxell Aqua Park Shinagawa
Sendai Umino-Mori Aquarium
List of botanical gardens in Japan

References 
 Itabashi Botanical Garden (Japanese)
 Jardins Botaniques Japonais article
 Living in Itabashi
 Yellow Pages Japan

Botanical gardens in Japan
Gardens in Tokyo
Greenhouses in Japan